The Jim Thorpe Memorial Trophy was an American football award presented by the Newspaper Enterprise Association (NEA) to the most valuable player (MVP) of the National Football League (NFL) from 1955 to 2008. It was the only NFL MVP award whose winner was chosen by a poll of NFL players. By 1975, the Jim Thorpe Trophy was described by the TimesDaily as "one of the pros' most coveted honors." In 1983, the Del Rio News Herald called it the "highest professional football award, period." Earl Campbell was the first player to win the award in consecutive seasons, capturing three straight from 1978 to 1980. Quarterbacks Charlie Conerly (1959) and Roman Gabriel (1969) won the trophy despite not being voted to the NEA's All-Pro first team in their respective seasons—Johnny Unitas was named to the first team over Conerly, while Sonny Jurgensen got the nod over Gabriel.

The award was founded by Murray Olderman, a sportswriter and cartoonist for the NEA. It was named in honor of Jim Thorpe, a professional football pioneer who was a player and the first president of what became the NFL. At the award's inception, Olderman sent ballots to every player in the league. Coaches joined the players in the voting process in 1975. Starting in 1987, the award became a joint project between the NEA, Jim Thorpe Association, and National Football League Players Association (NFLPA). Olderman also left the NEA that year and ended his association with the award. The NFLPA took over the balloting and added Pro Football Hall of Fame members to the voting panel in place of coaches.

The first recipient of the Jim Thorpe Trophy was Harlon Hill of the Chicago Bears, who was presented the trophy by NEA sports editor Harry Grayson in a televised halftime ceremony from the 1956 Pro Bowl in Los Angeles. In addition to Pro Bowl halftimes, subsequent years also saw the presentation televised on the final regular season weekend in either a pregame or halftime event. It was even on The Ed Sullivan Show in 1958. The presentation moved to the pregame show for the NFL championship game starting in 1961. In 1967, the winner was presented the trophy in a party at CBS Television City in Los Angeles for NEA's All-Pro selections, which was filmed and shown nationally during halftime of the Pro Bowl. In subsequent years, CBS aired a half-hour special before the Pro Bowl featuring the Jim Thorpe Trophy winner along with the All-Pros. After years of holding an awards banquet in New York, the ceremony was discontinued around 1980. Olderman and the NEA sought a sponsor. The Jim Thorpe Association of Oklahoma City, Oklahoma, took over the presentation of the trophy in 1987, presenting it at the existing awards banquet for their Jim Thorpe Award, which honors the top defensive back in college football. The NFL trophy was redesigned  that year to feature a bronze statuette of Jim Thorpe.

See also
 List of National Football League awards

References

External links
Newspaper Ent. Assoc. NFL Most Valuable Player Winners at Pro-Football-Reference.com

National Football League trophies and awards